This Ain't a Game is the second studio album by American R&B singer Ray J. It was released on June 19, 2001, under Atlantic Records in the United States.

Critical reception

Allmusic editor Jon Azpiri found that the album "is full of macho posturing that is more than a little tedious. The best of the tracks on the album feature production from The Neptunes [...] Since This Ain't a Game has so little to offer, that line is what listeners will remember most about Ray J." In a positive review, Craig Seymour from Entertainment Weekly wrote: "Brandy’s little brother Ray-J matures nicely on this sophomore set, with production by R&B hotshots Rodney Jerkins and The Neptunes. The singing/acting biz kid, who evokes Bobby Brown and Off the Wall-era Jacko, sounds surprisingly credible on the hard-knock-life odes." NME found tha This Ain't a Game "is Ray J’s big chance. [He] might sound like he researched the role as "playa" following Jay-Z around and watching from behind a newspaper with two eye holes cut in it but the track smokes, and that’s that. [...] Again, Jerkins’ beats are what draw your attention. The stand-outs are few. The trademark Jerkins skittery beats are many."

Chart performance
In the United States, the album debuted and peaked at number 21 on the Billboard 200 and at number nine on the Top R&B/Hip-Hop Albums, with first week sales of 18,321 copies. This Ain't a Game produced the top 40 hit single "Wait a Minute", featuring rapper Lil' Kim. It peaked at number 30 on the Billboard Hot 100. Second single, "Formal Invite" peaked at number 54 on the Hot R&B/Hip-Hop Singles & Tracks.

Track listing

Charts

References

2001 albums
Ray J albums
Albums produced by Rodney Jerkins
Albums produced by the Neptunes